Dana ( or ) as a surname may have several origins. In England, it came from dann, the valley of a meadow, and it may mean the dweller of that valley. In Continental Europe, it probably came from Dane (or Danish, from Denmark). This surname is related to Danese in Italy and it can be found mostly in the Piedmont region. It may also be a modification of Huguenot French origin, probably a variant of d'Aunay, of geographical origin. It may be also a Gaelic patronymic, since it is a common forename in Ireland. Dana is a relatively common surname in the US, ranking 7161 out of 88,799 in the 1990 U.S. Census. Dana is also the Persian word for wisdom.

At least into the first half of the 19th century, many American Danas were descended or of close relatives to Richard Henry Dana, who arrived in Cambridge, Massachusetts around 1640.Dana title also found in India.In India ,all Dana title bearing peoples are Hindu.

People with the surname Dana

Amasa Dana (1792–1867), American congressman (D-NY)
Audrey Dana, French actress
Bill Dana, see William Dana (disambiguation)
Charles Dana (disambiguation)
Daniel Dana (1771–1859), American educator, president of Dartmouth College
Deane Dana (1926–2005), American politician
Doris Dana (1920–2006), American writer and translator
E. Elizabeth Dana, proprietress of Miss Dana's School for Young Ladies
Edmund Trowbridge Dana (1818–1869), United States jurist
Edward Salisbury Dana, American mineralogist and physicist
Fra M. Dana (1874–1948), American artist
Francis Dana, American lawyer
Felipe Dana, Brazilian Photographer
George Augustus Dana (1840–1911), Canadian politician and playwright
Henry Dana (1820–1852), founder of the Native Police force in Victoria, Australia
Jack Dana (1921–1983), American basketball player
James Dana (disambiguation)
John Dana (disambiguation)
Joseph Dana (1742–1827), United States clergyman
Judah Dana (1772–1845), Maine statesman and United States Senator
Leora Dana (1923–1983), American actress
Lowell Dana (1891–1937), American football coach
Mazen Dana, Palestinian Reuters cameraman who was shot dead by US soldiers
Muriel Frances Dana (1916–1997), American child actress
Napoleon J.T. Dana (1822–1905), a career U.S. Army officer
Olive E. Dana (1859-?), American writer
Paul Dana (1975–2006), American race car driver
Paul Dana (journalist) (1852–1930), American journalist
Philippe Dana (born 1959), French journalist
Reza Dana, American doctor
Richard Dana (disambiguation)
Robert Dana (1929–2010), American poet
Sam Dana (1903–2007), American football player
Samuel Dana (1767–1835), Massachusetts politician, lawyer and judge
Samuel Dana (clergyman) (1739–1798), Massachusetts clergyman and politician
Samuel Luther Dana (1795–1868), a Massachusetts textile and agriculture chemist
Samuel W. Dana, American lawyer and politician
Simphiwe Dana, South African Xhosa singer-songwriter
Stephen Winchester Dana (born 1840), United States clergyman
Sophia Dana, nineteenth-century feminist, a Transcendentalist and later a Catholic
Susan Lawrence Dana American feminist, suffragist and member of National Women's Party
Vic Dana (born 1940), American dancer and singer
Viola Dana (also known as Viola Flugrath, born Virginia Flugrath), silent movie actress
Walter Dana, Polish-American musician
William Dana (disambiguation)

See also
Noah Dana-Picard, Israeli mathematician and Talmudic scholar
Paul Dano, actor